Just for Fun is a 1963 split EP by Bobby Vee and The Crickets, featuring the songs performed by the two acts in the musical film Just for Fun. 

The EP spent one week at number one in the UK EPs Chart, week ending 1 June 1963.

Track listing
Side one – Bobby Vee
"The Night Has a Thousand Eyes"
"All You've Got to Do is Touch Me"

Side two – The Crickets
"My Little Girl"
"Teardrops Fall Like Rain"

1963 EPs
Bobby Vee songs
The Crickets albums
Film soundtracks